Holoperas is a genus of snout moths. It was described by William Warren in 1891.

Species
Holoperas innotata Warren, 1891
Holoperas oenochroalis Ragonot, 1890

References

Chrysauginae
Pyralidae genera